Mark Frost (born November 25, 1953) is an American novelist, screenwriter, film and television producer and director. He is the co-creator of the mystery television series Twin Peaks (1990–1991; 2017) and was a writer and executive story editor of Hill Street Blues (1982–1985).

Early life
Mark Frost was born on November 25, 1953 in Brooklyn, New York City, to Mary Virginia Calhoun and actor Warren Frost. He is the elder brother of actress Lindsay Frost and writer and photographer Scott Frost. During his childhood, Frost was raised in Los Angeles, California and spent his adolescence in Minneapolis, Minnesota, where he attended Marshall-University High School. As a high-school student, he spent two years on an internship program studying and working at Minneapolis' Guthrie Theater.

Frost subsequently enrolled in Carnegie Mellon University (CMU) in Pittsburgh, Pennsylvania, studying acting, directing and playwriting. During his time in college, he worked as a member of the lighting crew on PBS Mister Rogers' Neighborhood alongside actor Michael Keaton. Frost graduated from CMU in 1975 with a Bachelor of Fine Arts. After his graduation, he returned to the Guthrie Theater in Minneapolis, where he was a literary associate until 1978.

Career
Frost was a writer for the NBC television series Hill Street Blues. He co-created the ABC television series Twin Peaks and On the Air with David Lynch. He co-wrote and directed the film Storyville, co-wrote Fantastic Four (2005) and wrote The Greatest Game Ever Played, based on his 2002 book of the same name.

His other books on golf are The Match: The Day the Game of Golf Changed Forever, about a 1956 match pitting pros Ben Hogan and Byron Nelson against amateurs Harvie Ward and Ken Venturi, and The Grand Slam, about the 1930 golf season of Bobby Jones. His fictional works include The List of Seven, The Six Messiahs, and The Second Objective.

Personal life
Frost has lived in Ojai, California, since 2011 with his wife Lynn and their son, Travis.

His nephew is Major League Baseball player Lucas Giolito.

Bibliography

Fiction
The List of Seven (1993)
The Six Messiahs (1995)
Before I Wake (1997)
The Second Objective (2009)
The Paladin Prophecy (2012)
The Paladin Prophecy 2: Alliance (2013)
The Paladin Prophecy 3: Rogue (2015)
The Secret History of Twin Peaks (2016)
Twin Peaks: The Final Dossier (2017)

Non-fiction
The Greatest Game Ever Played: A True Story (2002)
The Grand Slam: Bobby Jones, America, and the Story of Golf (2006)
The Match: The Day the Game of Golf Changed Forever (2007)
Game Six: Cincinnati, Boston, and the 1975 World Series (2009)

Filmography

Film

Television

Accolades
Bram Stoker Awards

Deauville American Film Festival

Golden Globe Awards

Primetime Emmy Awards

The Stinkers Bad Movie Awards

Writers Guild of America Awards

Notes

References

External links

1953 births
Living people
20th-century American male writers
20th-century American novelists
20th-century American screenwriters
21st-century American male writers
21st-century American novelists
21st-century American screenwriters
American male novelists
American male screenwriters
American male television writers
American television directors
American television writers
Carnegie Mellon University College of Fine Arts alumni
Film directors from New York City
Frost family
Novelists from New York (state)
Screenwriters from New York (state)
Television producers from New York City
Writers from Brooklyn